Dicranopselaphus is a genus of water-penny beetles in the family Psephenidae. There are over 40 described species in Dicranopselaphus, distributed in Asia and North America.

Species
These species belong to the genus Dicranopselaphus:

 Dicranopselaphus bicolor Lee & Yang, 1996 (China: Yunnan)
 Dicranopselaphus brevicornis Lee & Yang, 1996 (Indonesia)
 Dicranopselaphus dentatus Lee, Yang & Satô, 2000 (India: Assam, Meghalaya)
 Dicranopselaphus doiinthanonus Lee & Yang, 1996 (Thailand, Vietnam, Laos)
 Dicranopselaphus emasensis Lee & Yang, 1996 (Malaysia)
 Dicranopselaphus emmanueli Pic, 1918 (Philippines, Malaysia, Indonesia: Sumatra)
 Dicranopselaphus fangensis Lee & Yang, 1996 (Thailand)
 Dicranopselaphus flavicornis Guérin-Méneville, 1861 (Mexico: Veracruz)
 Dicranopselaphus flavus Lee & Yang, 1996 (Malaysia)
 Dicranopselaphus gressitti Lee, Yang & Satô, 2000 (China: Hubei)
 Dicranopselaphus imparis Lee, Yang & Satô, 2000 (Vietnam: Vĩnh Phúc Province)
 Dicranopselaphus jaechi Lee & Yang, 1996 (Indonesia: Java)
 Dicranopselaphus javanus Pic, 1916 (Indonesia: Java)
 Dicranopselaphus jiangxiensis Lee & Yang, 1996 (China: Jiangxi)
 Dicranopselaphus laevis Lee, Yang & Satô, 2000 (Vietnam: Lâm Đồng)
 Dicranopselaphus lesueurii Guérin-Méneville, 1861 (Mexico)
 Dicranopselaphus luzonensis Lee, Yang & Satô, 2000 (Philippines: Luzon)
 Dicranopselaphus malickyi Lee & Yang, 1996 (Thailand)
 Dicranopselaphus morimotoi Lee & Yang, 1996 (Thailand)
 Dicranopselaphus multimaculatus Pic, 1934 (Malaysia, Indonesia: Kalimantan)
 Dicranopselaphus nagaii Lee & Yang, 1996 (Philippines)
 Dicranopselaphus nantai Lee & Yang, 1996 (Taiwan)
 Dicranopselaphus nepalensis Lee & Yang, 1996 (Nepal, India)
 Dicranopselaphus pictus Guérin-Méneville, 1861 (Mexico: Oaxaca)
 Dicranopselaphus raii Lee, Yang & Satô, 2000 (Nepal: Kathmandu)
 Dicranopselaphus reticulatus Nakane, 1952 (Japan: Ryukyu islands)
 Dicranopselaphus rufescens Guérin-Méneville, 1861 (Mexico: Veracruz)
 Dicranopselaphus rufus Pic, 1916 (Malaysia, Singapore, Thailand, China: Yunnan)
 Dicranopselaphus sabahensis Lee & Yang, 1996 (Malaysia)
 Dicranopselaphus sakaii Lee & Yang, 1996 (Philippines)
 Dicranopselaphus sarawacensis Lee & Yang, 1996 (Malaysia)
 Dicranopselaphus schneideri Lee & Yang, 1996 (Indonesia)
 Dicranopselaphus septemspinosus Lee, Yang & Satô, 2000 (Myanmar: Kachin State)
 Dicranopselaphus sichuanensis Lee & Yang, 1996 (China: Sichuan)
 Dicranopselaphus similis Lee & Yang, 1996 (China: Fujian, Hong Kong)
 Dicranopselaphus spadix Lee, Yang & Satô, 2000 (Nepal: Kathmandu)
 Dicranopselaphus sumatrensis Lee, Yang & Satô, 2000 (Indonesia: Sumatra)
 Dicranopselaphus testaceicornis Pic, 1923 (China: Shandong)
 Dicranopselaphus variegatus Horn, 1880 (USA: Alabama) (variegated false water penny beetle)
 Dicranopselaphus venosus Champion, 1897

References

Further reading

 
 

Byrrhoidea
Articles created by Qbugbot